Attendant or attendance may refer to:

 Car attendant, a railroad employee
 Flight attendant, flight crew employed to ensure the safety and comfort of the passengers
 Museum attendant
 Toilet attendant, maintains standards in a toilet and collects any usage fees
 Parking attendant
 Sports attendance
 Servant
 The operator of a telephone Attendant console
 Attendance, the attending of an obligation or event

See also
Attention (disambiguation)